Arne Bjerhammar (September 15, 1917 – February 6, 2011) was a Swedish geodesist. He was professor at Royal Institute of Technology (KTH) in Stockholm. He was born in Båstad, Scania in the south of Sweden.

He developed a method used to determine the geoid in gravimetric data, as well as a system for electro-optical measuring of distances. He also did research about the Fennoscandian post-glacial rebound.

Research
His research covered many fields of geodesy. As a result of his doctor’s dissertation
“A contribution to the methods of optical distance measuring, specially with regard to
the problems of automatic plotting“ and for his refinement of the modulation system
of the Swedish EDM instrument Geodimeter he became one in the record of Swedish
inventors. However, many geodesists (and mathematicians) know him for the first
time for his new matrix algebra with generalized inverses, published in 1955
(in Swedish) and 1957 (in English). Seven years later, fascinated by M.S.
Molodensky’s new approach to solve the basic problems of physical geodesy, he
presented his original idea of analytical downward continuation of the gravity
anomaly to an internal sphere (“the Bjerhammar sphere”). Among other areas of interest are his original proposals of recovering the
Earth’s gravity field by using the energy integral for satellites (1967) and by the
theory of general relativity using atomic clocks (1975 and 1985) as well as his studies
on the correlation between the gravity field and the Fennoscandian land uplift
phenomenon (post-glacial rebound) in the 1970s. He is the author of about 200 scientific articles,
including two textbooks, many of the articles published as internal KTH reports. He
chaired the International Association of Geodesy study group on Statistical Methods in Geodesy (1963–1967).

His sabbatical leaves can be summarized as the stays as a visiting scientist at The
Research Institute for Geodetic Sciences in Alexandria, US, in 1967 and 1968, at
Stuttgart University (as an A-v-Humbold scholar) in 1982, National Geodetic Survey
in Washington, D.C., in 1984 and at Ohio State University in 1985 and 1986.

Recognition
His research was followed by national and international recognition, confirmed by
several prizes and rewards such as the German Gauss medal (1969), The Great Prize of KTH (1982), IAG’s Levallois medal (1987) and the Rossby Prize of the Swedish
Geophysical Society (1988). He has also been awarded Nordstjärneorden by his
Majesty the King of Sweden. In 1988 he became an honorary doctor of the Technical University of Graz.

Bibliography 

 A contribution to the methods of optical distance measuring, specially with regard to the problems of automatic plotting -1949
 Electro-optical distance measuring. - 1960
 Elementär geodesi. - 1964
 Felteori. - 1958
 A general formula for an unbiased estimate of the standard deviation of a triangulation network. -1961
 A general method for an explicit determination of the shape of the earth from gravimetric data. -1959
 A generalized matrix algebra. - 1958
 Geodesi - 1967
 Kompendium i instrumentlära. - 1961
 A method of combined centring and levelling for surveying instruments equipped with optimal plumb indicators. - 1948
 A new theory of geodetic gravity. -1964
 On an explicit solution of the gravimetric boundary value problem for an ellipsoidal surface of reference : final technical report -1962
 On gravity. - 1968
 On the geodetic boundary value problem for a fixed boundary surface / by Arne Bjerhammar and Leif Svensson - 1983
 On the principal geometrical problems of geodesy. - 1961
 A stochastic approach to the mixed boundary value problem in physical geodesy. - 1983
 Theory of errors and generalized matrix inverses. - 1973
 Triangular matrices for adjustment of triangular networks. - 1956
 Communications from the Royal Institute of Technology, division: Geodesy, Stockholm 70 to the twelfth General assembly of the International union of geodesy and geophysics in Helsinki, July 1960 / by A. Bjerhammar & G. Almkvist - 1960
 Planering : [en antologi] / Arne Bjerhammar'' - 1970

References

Swedish geodesists
2011 deaths
Swedish scientists
Academic staff of the KTH Royal Institute of Technology
1917 births